Francis McStay (1890 – 17 November 1935) was a Scottish footballer who played as a right half for Motherwell, spending eight years with the club spanning the World War I period. He was the older brother of  Willie and Jimmy McStay, both captains of Celtic, playing against Willie on several occasions.

References

1890 births
Date of birth missing
1935 deaths
Footballers from South Lanarkshire
Irish association footballers (before 1923)
Scottish people of Irish descent
Association football wing halves
Scottish footballers
Motherwell F.C. players
Armadale F.C. players
Scottish Football League players
Larkhall United F.C. players
Scottish Junior Football Association players
McStay family (footballers)
Sportspeople from County Antrim